Ernando Ari Sutaryadi (born 27 February 2002) is an Indonesian professional footballer who plays as a goalkeeper for Liga 1 club Persebaya Surabaya and the Indonesia national team.

Club career

Persebaya Surabaya 
In October 2018, Persebaya Surabaya announced a deal for Ernando to join the club, not only himself, Persebaya also signed his teammate in the Indonesia U16 national team, Brylian Aldama. He will not immediately join the Persebaya senior team. He had to start his career by joining Persebaya U16.

In January 2019, Ernando was officially promoted to the Persebaya Surabaya senior team, and is ready to made his first career with the team in Indonesian Liga 1, He has joined Persebaya U16 since last season who appeared in the 2018 Elite Pro Academy Liga 1 U16, Ernando actually did not think about joining Persebaya. born in Semarang, initially he wanted to join PSIS Semarang U16 to appear in the same competition. As a result, the player quota at the club was full, causing Ernando to fail to join. The process of joining Persebaya was due to accidental factors.

2021–22 season
Ernando made his first-team debut for Persebaya on 7 April 2021 as a starter in a match against PS Sleman in the 2021 Menpora Cup tournament. He played his first official league match on 4 September 2021 in a 1–3 loss against Borneo.

International career
Ernando debuted for the Indonesia U-16 team in 2017 before leading the team to win the 2018 AFF U-16 Youth Championship. He also played in the 2019 AFF U-18 Youth Championship. In 2018, Ernando represented the Indonesia U-16, in the 2018 AFC U-16 Championship. He been call-up for the Senior Team against Chinese Taipei for 2023 AFC Asian Cup qualification. He stopped a penalty from Patrick Wood in his third international U23 team match in a 2–3 loss against Australia U23 on 26 October 2021.

In December 2021, he was named in Indonesian's squad for the 2020 AFF Championship in Singapore. On 12 December 2021, Ernando earned his first cap, starting in a 2020 AFF Championship against Laos at Bishan Stadium, Bishan, Singapore.

Career statistics

Club

Notes

International appearances

Honours

Club 
Persebaya Surabaya U-20
 Elite Pro Academy U-20: 2019

International
Indonesia U-16
 JENESYS Japan-ASEAN U-16 Youth Football Tournament: 2017
 AFF U-16 Youth Championship: 2018
Indonesia U-19
 AFF U-19 Youth Championship third place: 2019
Indonesia U-23
 Southeast Asian Games  Bronze medal: 2021
Indonesia
 AFF Championship runner-up: 2020

References

External links 
 Ernando Ari at Soccerway
 Ernando Ari at Liga Indonesia

2002 births
Living people
Indonesian footballers
Indonesia youth international footballers
Liga 1 (Indonesia) players
Persebaya Surabaya players
People from Semarang
Sportspeople from Central Java
Indonesia international footballers
Association football goalkeepers
Competitors at the 2021 Southeast Asian Games
Southeast Asian Games bronze medalists for Indonesia
Southeast Asian Games medalists in football